Trishelle Cannatella (born November 4, 1979) is an American reality television contestant, Playboy model, and actress, known for her appearances on the MTV reality television series The Real World: Las Vegas, and the Real World spinoff show The Challenge. She has also appeared on other reality shows such as The Surreal Life, Kill Reality, Punk'd and Fear Factor. She has also made appearances in TV ads and music videos, posed nude in Playboy magazine, appeared in the horror film The Scorned, and competed successfully in celebrity poker tournaments.

Career

The Real World and The Challenge
Sullen about the impending need to pay back her student loans as her graduation neared in 2002, Cannatella heard a radio ad for a show called Lost in the U.S.A., which offered a $50,000 prize, and would be co-produced by Bunim-Murray Productions and air on The WB. The show was axed during the auditions, and she was invited to audition for Bunim-Murray's twelfth season of the long-running reality show The Real World, which was set in Las Vegas and would later air in 2002-2003. She accepted, but perceived the questions she was asked during the audition process to be part of an attempt by the producers to cast her as the stereotypical racist and homophobic southern cast member, and later, in light of the questions they asked about her religion, as the "holy roller". Cannatella was selected as a cast member. During her stay, she and her roommates worked in the hotel and clubs. Cannatella and her fellow castmates felt pressure from the producers to act out for the cameras in order to make appealing airtime, saying that she was asked leading questions by the producers about her plans on certain nights. She also notes that alcohol was made readily available to the cast, which she pointed out in light of the fact that alcoholism runs in her family.

During the season of Road Rules: Campus Crawl, which was filmed at the same time as The Real World: Las Vegas, the cast members from the two shows faced off against each other in a series of challenges.

In 2003, Cannatella was also a member of the Real World team during the Real World/Road Rules Challenge: The Gauntlet, but was sent home when she lost a gauntlet to Sarah Greyson. She also competed in the succeeding season, The Inferno, but was eliminated second. In May 2007, she appeared on the reunion show, Reunited: The Real World Las Vegas.

In 2012, she returned to the Challenge and competed with former Real World housemate, Alton Williams, The Real World: Las Vegas (2011) alums Dustin Zito and Nany González in The Challenge: Battle of the Seasons; she and Zito finished the season in second place after Williams and Gonzalez were eliminated earlier in the season.

The next year, Cannatella returned for another Challenge season titled Rivals II, where she was placed in a team with fellow contestant Sarah Rice from The Real World: Brooklyn, whom she had conflict with in Battle of the Seasons. In Episode 3, Cannatella quit the game after she got into an argument with Aneesa Ferreira, and became intolerant of the conditions in the house. Rice was sent home by default because she was left without a partner.

Cannatella was a cast member of the Paramount+ spin-off series The Challenge: All Stars, which premiered April 1, 2021. She was eliminated in the second episode, placing 21st overall.

Other television work
In 2005, Cannatella was a part of the reality show Kill Reality which chronicled the making of the movie The Scorned. She has also appeared in an episode of the reality show that pranks celebrities, Punk'd, hosted by Ashton Kutcher.

Cannatella appeared on Fear Factor in a special reality themed episode in 2006. Her partner was ex-boyfriend Mike Mizanin. The two competed against other teams of former reality contestants including Jonny Fairplay and Victoria Fuller. In the end, Cannatella and Mizanin won the show, taking home the prize money and several other prizes.

Cannatella appeared in the USA Network reality series Dr. Steve-O. She was the first cast member signed to the CMT show Hulk Hogan's Celebrity Championship Wrestling. After intensive training to become a professional wrestler known as "The Red Hot Redneck".

Cannatella appeared briefly in episode 3 of the Lifetime television series Married at First Sight, as the friend and wedding guest of Henry, one of the groomsmen.

Modeling and appearances
Cannatella has posed nude for Playboy magazine and the online Playboy Cyber Club. She also appeared in a Playboy DVD. She played quarterback for the New York Euphoria in Lingerie Bowl III, winning MVP in their victory.

Cannatella appears in William Hung's music video for his single "She Bangs". During the 2007 Super Bowl, she appeared in a commercial for GoDaddy.com alongside former WWE Diva Candice Michelle. Later that year, she also appeared in the May 2007 issue of Stuff and on their website to promote her new television series VIP Passport, in which she and several other women fly to hot-spots around the world.

Poker career
Cannatella is also a poker player. She finished third in the 2010 WPT Invitational Tournament and won $20,000. In 2013, Cannatella shot a pilot in Barcelona for the a poker reality show titled Living the Life with Amanda Kimmel of Survivor.

Filmography

Film

Television

References

External links

1979 births
American television actresses
Legends Football League players
Living people
Actresses from Louisiana
American poker players
Reality show winners
The Real World (TV series) cast members
University of Southern Mississippi alumni
People from Cut Off, Louisiana
The Challenge (TV series) contestants
21st-century American women